With Wilbert Robinson taking over as the new manager, many in the press began using the nickname Brooklyn Robins for the 1914 season along with other names. The Robins finished in 5th place, just missing finishing with a .500 record.

Offseason
 December 20, 1913: Dick Egan was purchased by the Robins from the Cincinnati Reds.

Regular season

Season standings

Record vs. opponents

Notable transactions
 June 27, 1914: Joe Riggert was purchased from the Robins by the St. Louis Cardinals.
 July 6, 1914: Casey Hageman was purchased from the Robins by the Chicago Cubs.
 August 7, 1914: Bill Steele was purchased by the Robins from the St. Louis Cardinals.
 August 10, 1914: Red Smith was purchased from the Robins by the Boston Braves.

Roster

Player stats

Batting

Starters by position 
Note: Pos = Position; G = Games played; AB = At bats; H = Hits; Avg. = Batting average; HR = Home runs; RBI = Runs batted in

Other batters 
Note: G = Games played; AB = At bats; H = Hits; Avg. = Batting average; HR = Home runs; RBI = Runs batted in

Pitching

Starting pitchers 
Note: G = Games pitched; IP = Innings pitched; W = Wins; L = Losses; ERA = Earned run average; SO = Strikeouts

Other pitchers 
Note: G = Games pitched; IP = Innings pitched; W = Wins; L = Losses; ERA = Earned run average; SO = Strikeouts

Relief pitchers 
Note: G = Games pitched; W = Wins; L = Losses; SV = Saves; ERA = Earned run average; SO = Strikeouts

Notes

References 
Baseball-Reference season page
Baseball Almanac season page

External links 
1914 Brooklyn Robins uniform
Brooklyn Dodgers reference site
Acme Dodgers page 
Retrosheet

Los Angeles Dodgers seasons
Brooklyn Robins season
Brook
1910s in Brooklyn
Flatbush, Brooklyn